Beta Ethniki 2008–09 complete season.

Overview
 The season started on 14 September 2008 and was scheduled to end on 17 May 2009.
 Last season champions Panserraikos, runners-up Thrasyvoulos and third-placed Panthrakikos earned promotion to Super League Greece, while Agios Dimitrios, Chaidari and Egaleo were relegated to Gamma Ethniki (see 2007–08 Beta Ethniki).
 Apollon Kalamarias, Veria and Atromitos will compete in Beta Ethniki this season after being relegated from the Super League in 2007–08.
 Diagoras, Kavala, and Anagennisi Karditsa will compete in Beta Ethniki this season after earning promotion from Gamma Ethniki in 2007–08.

League table

Results

Top scorers

References

External links
RSSSF.org

Second level Greek football league seasons
Greece
2